Viktor Masing  (11 April 1925, Tartu – 18  March 2001) was an Estonian botanist and ecologist. He was born in Tartu. He became a member of the Estonian Academy of Sciences in 1993.

He was a specialist in telmatology, and an organizer of wetland protection.

His son, Matti Masing, is a renowned nature scientist, and one of Europe's foremost experts on bats.

External links
Biography

20th-century Estonian botanists
Estonian ecologists
1925 births
2001 deaths
Scientists from Tartu
Academic staff of the University of Tartu
Members of the Estonian Academy of Sciences
Recipients of the Order of the National Coat of Arms, 3rd Class
Burials at Raadi cemetery